Something Crucial is the fifth album by rapper JT the Bigga Figga, his first of several released in 1999.  The album was released on September 28, 1999 for Get Low Recordz and was produced by JT the Bigga Figga.

Track listing
"Mob Wit' This"- 3:00 
"Thug in Me" feat. Steady Mobb'n & Killa Tay- 4:07 
"Another Episode"- 4:41 
"Certified" feat. Killa Tay, Guce & AP9- 4:23 
"Fedi Can't Buy You Love" feat. Mykatan- 4:34 
"The Hidden Hand" feat. The Commisiona & Dame- 4:45 
"Something Crucial" feat. Sigmen- 4:18 
"Too Fly for Me" feat. Miss Mocha- 3:56 
"Beware of Those" feat. Mac Mall & Yukmouth- 3:53 
"Get Low Anthem" feat. Gamblaz- 4:38 
"Don't Get It Twisted"- 3:49 
"Beating Prophecy" feat. San Quinn, Brotha John & Shug- 4:47

References

JT the Bigga Figga albums
1999 albums